Safeco Insurance, a member of Liberty Mutual Group, is an American insurance company. It held the naming rights to the Seattle Mariners' baseball stadium Safeco Field from its opening in 1999 through the end of the 2018 season.

History 

Safeco was founded in Seattle, Washington in 1923 by Hawthorne K. Dent as the General Insurance Company of America, a property and casualty insuring company. This name is still used by Safeco on some of its insurance products. Thirty years later the company founded the Selective Auto and Fire Ensurance Company of America, or SAFECO (i.e., S.A.F.E. Co.).

General Insurance's first headquarters were in downtown Seattle at the corner of University Street and Fourth Avenue.

In 1936, it moved to the eight-story Brooklyn Building at the corner of N.E. 45th Street and Brooklyn Avenue N.E. in the University District.

General Insurance began to sell life insurance in 1957. Eleven years later the corporate name changed from the General Insurance Company of America to Safeco Corporation. (The company would end up changing the capitalization of its name from SAFECO to Safeco at the turn of the century.) Around the same time the company began to offer mutual funds and commercial credit (though precursors to the Safeco Funds had been around since the 1930s).

Safeco replaced the Brooklyn Building with the 22-story Safeco Plaza building in 1973. It remains the tallest building in the city outside Downtown.

Acquisitions 

In 1997, Safeco bought American States Financial Corporation to expand beyond the West Coast. Washington Mutual's WM Life Insurance Company was purchased the same year. Two years later, Safeco bought R.F. Bailey (Underwriting Agencies) Limited of London.

Restructuring 

In 2001, new management was brought in to restructure the company. Commercial credit operations were sold to General Electric in 2001, and on March 15, 2004, the company announced the sale of its most profitable division, the life insurance and investments business, to a group of private investors led by Safeco board members and Warren Buffett's Berkshire Hathaway Inc. and White Mountains Insurance Group, Ltd., incorporating as Symetra Financial Corporation. The same day, it was announced that Hub International Ltd. was buying Safeco's insurance brokerage operations. Less than a month later, on April 12, it was announced that Mellon Financial Corporation would buy Safeco Trust Company, whose business is providing financial and estate planning services to individuals with over $1 million in assets. On August 2, the closure of Safeco Asset Management, the mutual-fund business, was announced.

On April 6, 2005, CEO Mike McGavick announced that Safeco would be consolidating operations at either the University District "home office" campus or the newer Eastside campus in Redmond, pending a competition between Microsoft and the University of Washington for the sale of one or the other location. On January 19, 2006, it was announced that Microsoft would purchase the Redmond campus for $209.5 million. Plans were announced for a new  office tower across the street from Safeco Plaza to house the approximately 1,300 Redmond employees. However, McGavick subsequently stepped down as CEO to run for the U.S. Senate.  In a surprise move, his replacement Paula Rosput Reynolds announced on August 30, 2006, that the entire University District complex would be sold as well, to the University of Washington for $130 million. Employees were told they would be moved to leased space in downtown Seattle.  Some speculated this signalled the imminent sale of the company, although Safeco denied this. Safeco moved back downtown in 2007; its new headquarters at 1001 Fourth Avenue became the new Safeco Plaza, and the old Safeco Plaza was renamed UW Tower.

Liberty Mutual Insurance 

On April 23, 2008, Safeco announced an agreement to be acquired by Liberty Mutual for $68.25 per share. Safeco continues to offer personal lines insurance (including auto, home, motorcycle, recreational vehicle, watercraft and more) through independent agents

Philanthropy 

On February 12, 2010, Safeco announced its donation of more than 800 pieces of its Safeco Art Collection to the Washington Art Consortium. This move was hailed by members of the local arts community as being a significant and rare gift.

Notes

References

External links 
Official site
 Historical Annual Reports for Safeco

Insurance companies of the United States
Companies formerly listed on the Nasdaq
Companies based in Seattle
Financial services companies established in 1923
1923 establishments in Washington (state)
American companies established in 1923
2008 mergers and acquisitions
Liberty Mutual
American corporate subsidiaries